Cape Billings ( - Mys Billingsa), is a headland on the northern coast of Chukotka, Russian Federation to the west of Cape Schmidt.

Geography
The shore in the area around Cape Billings is bounded by narrow landspits, beach ridges and swales enclosing a series of coastal inshore lagoons, with the Long Strait lies north of this headland. The Chukchi settlement of Billings, is located close to the cape. There is a curious series of linked oval lakes of decreasing size along the shore towards west from the cape. Cape Yakan is located about 65 km to the east of Cape Billings.

Climate

Wildlife
The Fuzzy hermit crab (Pagurus trigonocheirus) inhabits the waters off Cape Billings.

Etymology
This cape was named after British Captain Joseph Billings (1758–1806) who was at the service of the Russian Imperial Navy during Empress Catherine II of Russia's reign.

References

External links
 

Billings